Suresh Chandra Deb (born May 1894, date of death unknown) was an Indian politician belonging to the Indian National Congress.  He was elected to the Lok Sabha, lower house of the Parliament of India from the Cachar-Lushai Hills constituency Assam in 1952.

References

External links
 Official biographical sketch in Parliament of India website

1894 births
Year of death missing
India MPs 1952–1957
Indian National Congress politicians from Assam
Lok Sabha members from Assam